The Tennessee State Tigers football program represents Tennessee State University in the sport of American football. The Tigers compete in the NCAA Division I Football Championship Subdivision (FCS) as member of the Ohio Valley Conference.

History

First FBS Victory 
Tennessee State Tigers first FBS victory came in 2017 when they defeated the Georgia State Panthers 17-10 for Georgia State's season home opener.

Championships

National championships

Conference championships

Bowl games

Division I-AA/FCS Playoffs results
The Tigers have appeared in the I-AA/FCS playoffs six times with a record of 3–6.

College Football Hall of Fame

Alumni in the NFL
Over 100 Tennessee State alumni have played in the NFL, including:

Richard Dent
Onzy Elam
Joe Gilliam
Mike Hegman
Sylvester Hicks
Bennie Anderson
Claude Humphrey
Ed "Too Tall" Jones
Jim Kelly
Greg Kindle
Loaird McCreary
Dominique Rodgers-Cromartie
Harold Rice
Anthony Shelton
Jim Thaxton
Mike Jones
Larry Kinnebrew
Steve Moore
Herman Hunter
Gilbert Renfroe
Malcolm Taylor

Annual Classic
 Southern Heritage Classic

References

External links
 

 
American football teams established in 1916
1916 establishments in Tennessee